There is also an academic journal sharing the same name: China Economic Review (journal)
China Economic Review (Pinyin: Zhōngguó Jīngjì Pínglùn; also referred to as CER) is an English-language quarterly (formerly monthly) business and economics magazine published by the UK-registered China Economic Review Publishing Ltd. The magazine was launched in London in 1990. Its main editorial office is in Hong Kong. The magazine's content focuses on China business news, opinion and analysis.

Ownership 
The magazine is owned by China Economic Review Publishing Ltd.

Readership 
China Economic Review is mainly distributed to subscribers in mainland China. Its distribution is audited by HKABC.

Editors 
Hudson Lockett (September 2014 - March 2016)
Oliver Pearce (July 2013 - September 2014)
Jake Spring (April 2013 - July 2013)
Ana Swanson (November 2011 - April 2013)
Pete Sweeney (March 2011 - November 2011)
Andrew Galbraith (2010 – March 2011)
Tim Burroughs (2005 – 2010)
Joel McCormick (2004 – 2005)
Chris Horton (2004)
Jamil Anderlini (2003 – 2004)
David Lammie (1993 – 2003)
Anna Jones (- 1993)

Notable columnists
Robert Abbanat
David Bandurski
Philip Bowring
Richard Brubaker
Frank Ching
Patrick Chovanec
Ken DeWoskin
Steven M. Dickinson
Tom Doctoroff
Bill Dodson
Charles Freeman
Duncan Freeman
Paul French
Bates Gill
Charles R. McElwee
Turloch Mooney
Malcolm Moore
Chris Patten
Jack Rodman
Andy Rothman

Awards
Society of Publishers in Asia Awards (SOPA Awards):
2013 SOPA Awards: Honorable Mention for Excellence in Explanatory Reporting - "Awash in Cash"
2010 SOPA Awards: Honorable Mention for Excellence in Special Coverage  - "Cleanup Job"
2008 SOPA Awards: Honorable Mention for Excellence in Business Reporting  - "Starting Afresh"
2007 SOPA Awards: Excellence in Explanatory Reporting  - "Mother of Invention"

References

External links
 China Economic Review (CER)

Business magazines published in the United Kingdom
Monthly magazines published in the United Kingdom
English-language magazines
Magazines published in London
Magazines established in 1990